Kersti Hermansson (born in 1951) is a Professor for Inorganic Chemistry at Uppsala University.

Education and professional career 
She did her PhD on "The Electron Distribution in the Bound Water Molecule" in 1984. From 1984 to 1986, she had a postdoctoral fellowship from the Swedish Research Council with Dr. E. Clementi at IBM-Kingston, USA. From 1986–1988, she was a Högskolelektor in Inorganic Chemistry at Uppsala University. In 1988, she was a docent of Inorganic Chemistry at Uppsala University. In 1996, she was a Biträdande professor. Since 2000, she is a professor of Inorganic Chemistry at Uppsala University. During this time (2008-2013), she was a part-time guest professor at KTH Stockholm.

Research 
Her research focuses on condensed-matter chemistry including the investigation of chemical bonding and development of quantum chemical methods.

Awards 
She received several prizes for her research:

 "Letterstedska priset" from the Swedish Royal Academy of Sciences (KVA) (1987)
 "Oskarspriset" from Uppsala University (1988)
 "Norblad-Ekstrand" medal in gold from the Swedish Chemical Society (2003)
 Member of Kungl. Vetenskapssamhället (Academia regia scientiarum Upsaliensis, KVSU), Uppsala (since 1988)
 Member of Royal Society of Science (since 2002)
 Member of Royal Swedish Academy of Sciences (since 2007)
 Adjunct professor at the Kasetsart University, Bangkok (2005)
 Honorary guest professor at the Department of Ion Physics and Applied Physics, Innsbruck University (since June 2009)

References 

Academic staff of Uppsala University
Quantum chemistry
Living people
Swedish Royal Academies
Kersti Hermansson
IBM Fellows
1951 births